Anne Lill (born 15 October 1946) is an Estonian classical philologist and translator. She is Professor Emeritus at the University of Tartu.

Education 
Anne Laansoo was born on 15 October 1946. She graduated from University of Tartu in 1970. From 1976 to 1978 she was a postgraduate student at Leningrad State University. In 1987 she defended her doctoral thesis at the University of Tartu with research entitled: "The foreign elements in terms of medical terminology in shaping Estonian 1869-1914". This work examined the issues around the transfer of the Latin and Ancient Greek prefix and suffix systems from classical to other languages.

Career 
Lill started working at Tartu State University in 1978. She was first a lecturer at the Department of Foreign Languages, then from 1989 to 1992 she was an associate professor. In 1991, based on Lill's initiative, classical philology as a specialism was restored at the University of Tartu. From 1992 to 2012 she was a Professor of Classical Philology; since 16 April 2012 Lill has been Professor Emeritus.

Lill has supervised many students, including legal scholar . She has published widely and translated several classical authors, including: Aristophanes, Euripides, Aristotle, Euripides' Iphigenia in Aulis, Apuleius. She has published on Horace's Carpe Diem, as well as the concept of the symposium in Latin and Greek literature. She has translated German and Russian texts to Estonian, including those of Freud, Nietzsche and Stolovich.

Selected publications 
 The Lexicon of Tragedy: Themes and Characters in Ancient Greek Theatre (Tartu, 2004)
 Man and the World in Greek Tragedy (Tartu, 2008)

Awards 
 2001 - Order of the White Star, Class V.
 2013 - Aleksander Kurtna Award.

Personal life
Anne Lill's father was noted violinist and guitarist Emil Lanssoo. She had a previous relationship with writer, poet, translator, cultural critic and philosopher Jaan Kaplinski, with whom she has a son, composer Märt-Matis Lill, born in 1975.

References 

1946 births
Living people
Estonian classical scholars
Academic staff of the University of Tartu
University of Tartu alumni
Estonian philologists
Classical philologists
Estonian translators
Recipients of the Order of the White Star, 5th Class
Translators of Ancient Greek texts
Translators from Latin
Translators from German
Translators from Russian
Translators of Friedrich Nietzsche
Translators to Estonian